Mühlenbecker Land is a municipality in the Oberhavel district, in Brandenburg, Germany.

History
The municipality shared its borders partly with the former West Berlin, and so during the period 1961-1990 it was separated from it by the Berlin Wall.

Demography

References

Localities in Oberhavel